1993–94 Albanian Cup was the forty-second season of Albania's annual cup competition. It began in August 1993 with the First Round and ended in May 1994 with the final matches. The winners of the competition qualified for the 1994-95 first qualifying round of the UEFA Cup. Partizani were the defending champions, having won their fourteenth Albanian Cup last season. The cup was won by Tirana.

The first rounds were played in a two-legged format similar to those of European competitions. If the aggregated score was tied after both games, the team with the higher number of away goals advanced. If the number of away goals was equal in both games, the match was decided by extra time and a penalty shootout, if necessary. The quarter finals though were played in two groups with double round robin schedule each. The top 2 teams in each groups moved on to the next round of the competition.

First round
Games were played on August & September 1993*

 Results unknown

Second round
All sixteen teams of the 1992–93 Superliga and First Division entered in this round. Matches were played in four groups with one round robin schedule each. The top 2 teams in each groups moved on to the next round of the competition.

Group 1

Group 2

Group 3

Group 4

Quarter-finals
In this round entered the 8 winners from the previous rounds. Matches were played in two groups with double round robin schedule each. The top 2 teams in each groups moved on to the next round of the competition.

Group 1

Group 2

Semi-finals
In this round entered the four winners from the previous round.

Finals

First leg

Second leg

References

 Calcio Mondiale Web

External links
 Official website 

Cup
1993–94 domestic association football cups
1993-94